Daphnella mitrellaformis is a species of sea snail, a marine gastropod mollusk in the family Raphitomidae.

Description
The length of the shell varies between 18 mm and 40 mm.

Distribution
This marine species occurs off the Philippines and Japan

References

 Nomura, S., 1940: Mollusca dredged by the Husa-maru from the Pacific coast of Tiba Prefecture, Japan. Rec Oceanogr Works Japan 12(1): 81–116
 Liu J.Y. [Ruiyu] (ed.). (2008). Checklist of marine biota of China seas. China Science Press. 1267 pp.

External links
 
  Li B.-Q. [Baoquan] & Li X.-Z. [Xinzheng] (2014) Report on the Raphitomidae Bellardi, 1875 (Mollusca: Gastropoda: Conoidea) from the China Seas. Journal of Natural History 48(17–18): 999–1025
 Gastropods.com: Daphnella (Daphnella) mitrellaformis

mitrellaformis
Gastropods described in 1940